Masayoshi Ise (伊勢正義, 28 February 1907 – 18 November 1985) was a Japanese painter. His work was part of the painting event in the art competition at the 1936 Summer Olympics.

References

1907 births
1985 deaths
20th-century Japanese painters
Japanese painters
Olympic competitors in art competitions
People from Akita Prefecture